The 23rd Moscow International Film Festival was held from 21 to 30 June 2001. The Golden St. George was awarded to the American film The Believer directed by Henry Bean.

Jury
 Margarethe von Trotta (Germany – President of the Jury)
 Jiang Wen (China)
 Bohdan Stupka (Ukraine)
 Moritz de Hadeln (Germany)
 Ingeborga Dapkūnaitė (Lithuania)
 Igor Maslennikov (France)
 Geoffrey Gilmore (United States)

Films in competition
The following films were selected for the main competition:

Awards
 Golden St. George: The Believer by Henry Bean
 Special Golden St.George: Under the Skin of the City by Rakhshan Bani-E'temad
 Silver St. George:
 Best Director: Ettore Scola for Unfair Competition
 Best Actor: Vladimir Mashkov for The Quickie
 Best Actress: Rie Miyazawa for Peony Pavilion
 Special Silver St. George: Eduard Artemyev, composer
 Stanislavsky Award: Jack Nicholson
 Prix FIPRESCI: Blind Guys by Péter Tímár

References

External links
Moscow International Film Festival: 2001 at Internet Movie Database

2001
2001 film festivals
2001 festivals in Europe
Moscow
2001 in Moscow
June 2001 events in Russia